Foreign Intelligence service may refer to:

 Foreign Intelligence service (Armenia)
 Foreign Intelligence service (Azerbaijan)
 Estonian Foreign Intelligence Service 
 Mossad Foreign Intelligence, Israel
 Foreign Intelligence Service (Kazakhstan)
 Foreign Intelligence Service (Romania)
 Foreign Intelligence Service (Russia)
 Foreign Intelligence Service of Ukraine
 Research and Analysis Wing (India)

See also
National Intelligence Service (disambiguation)
State Intelligence Service (disambiguation)
Federal Intelligence Service (disambiguation)
General Intelligence Directorate (disambiguation)
Directorate of Military Intelligence (disambiguation)
Intelligence Bureau (disambiguation)